Series Populneae is a series within the genus Crataegus that contains at least eight species of hawthorn trees and shrubs, native to Eastern North America. Only one species, C. populnea is widespread.

Species
The species in the series are:
 Crataegus beata
 Crataegus populnea
 Crataegus prona
 Crataegus jesupii
 Crataegus levis
 Crataegus delawarensis
 Crataegus aemula
 Crataegus stolonifera

The rare and poorly documented species Crataegus haemacarpa may also belong to this series.

References

External links

Populneae
Flora of North America
Plant series